Fried Egg I'm in Love is a restaurant with multiple locations in Portland, Oregon.

Description
Fried Egg I'm in Love has been described as a "music pun-themed breakfast sandwich shop". The signature sandwich is the Yolko Ono, described as "oniony sausage patties" with pesto, a fried egg, and toasted sourdough. The Egg Zeppelin has two vegetable patties, a fried egg, two slices of cheddar cheese, and aardvark aioli. The Free-Range Against the Machine has egg, avocado, tomato, and havarti.

History

The business initially operated from a single food cart. Jace Krause and Ryan Lynch started Fried Egg I'm in Love in 2012. In 2017, Krause became the sole owner and a second location opened at Pioneer Courthouse Square in downtown Portland. A brick and mortar restaurant began operating on Hawthorne Boulevard in southeast Portland's Sunnyside neighborhood in 2019. In 2020, the business opened another cart at the pod Prost Marketplace, in the north Portland part of the Boise neighborhood.

Reception
Michael Russell included the restaurant in The Oregonian 2020 list of "Portland's 40 best inexpensive restaurants". In 2021, Portland Monthly included the business in a list of "11 Breakfast Sandwiches to Get You out of Bed". The magazine included the Yolko Ono in a 2022 list of "The 12 Best Breakfasts in Portland".

References

External links

 
 

2012 establishments in Oregon
Boise, Portland, Oregon
Food carts in Portland, Oregon
North Portland, Oregon
Restaurants established in 2012
Southwest Portland, Oregon
Sunnyside, Portland, Oregon